Diebenkorn "D.B." Russell is a fictional character, portrayed by Ted Danson, from the CBS crime franchise CSI. Danson made his franchise debut in CSI: Crime Scene Investigation season twelve episode "73 Seconds". He also starred as a series regular on the second season of CSI: Cyber.

Casting
Following Laurence Fishburne's (Raymond Langston) decision to leave CSI: Crime Scene Investigation at the end of the eleventh season, producers immediately sought his replacement. Lynette Rice and James Hibberd from Entertainment Weekly reported that broadcaster CBS sent offers out to Tony Shalhoub, Robin Williams and John Lithgow for the role. In July 2011, it was announced that Ted Danson had been cast as D.B. Russell, the new CSI graveyard shift supervisor. Of his casting, the show's executive producer, Carol Mendelsohn, stated "We're very excited Ted Danson came along. You can create a new character on the page, but until the perfect actor comes along and breathes life into it, it's just words." Mendelsohn's colleague, Don McGill, added that Danson "couldn't be more perfect" for the role. Danson made his first appearance on September 21, 2011. In March 2013, following the announcement of Season 14, it was confirmed that Ted Danson had signed for two more years on the show. On May 13, 2015, CBS announced that Danson would join the cast of CSI: Cyber during its second season, after which he  departed the franchise.

Background 
Russell is presented to the audience as incredibly intelligent, though he didn't receive any formal education until college.  His parents, hippies, were itinerant folk musicians, who named him for artist Richard Diebenkorn and raised him in a camper-van. He was married to Barbara Russell, but wound up divorcing her. Together they had four children, including a son, Charlie, who is a student and basketball player at Western Las Vegas University, and a daughter, Maya, who has a daughter of her own, Kaitlyn. Professionally, it is revealed that Russell had previously worked as the Director of a crime lab in Seattle, Washington, alongside Detective Daniel Shaw and blood spatter analyst Julie Finlay. He comes to Las Vegas as the new Night Shift Supervisor, since Catherine Willows and Nick Stokes were demoted as a result of the Internal Affairs investigation that removed Raymond Langston from the team.

Storylines

CSI: Crime Scene Investigation

Season 12 

A keen forensic botanist, Russell arrived in Las Vegas having given up the directorship of the Seattle Crime Lab at the request of Conrad Ecklie. Brought in to "clean house" and stabilize the team following the recent I.A. investigation into Raymond Langston's murder of Nate Haskell and the subsequent departmental re-shuffling that cost both Catherine and Nick their supervisory roles due to poor leadership, Russell found himself with the significant task of boosting morale and restoring discipline. Whilst the team quickly became aware of his eccentric personality and obscure deductive techniques, they were initially hesitant of accepting him as one of their own.

In the episode "Bittersweet", Russell confronts Sara. D.B. hands the case to Sara, who takes apart the concrete blocks with the body parts and finds a young girl with sexual trauma. While D.B. is not pleased with her, he does not pull her off the case and instead supervises her closely. After the case, D.B. sits with Sara and asks her out to dinner, as friends. In the episode "Ms. Willows Regrets", as Catherine (who is in tears) criticizes an FBI agent for not protecting her friend Laura and four other agents, Russell tells her to walk away from the situation and go home; but when he arrives in his office and looks at an email that Catherine sent, he is surprised to see that she intends to resign. When Catherine gets home, her home is shot at with her inside. As she is able to get out of the house safely, Russell rushes to the rescue and is able to drive away, with Catherine barely making it through, due to the people who were trying to gun her down. In the next episode, "Willows in the Wind", he escapes with Catherine, who has been shot. They finally return to the crime lab after Catherine tells him about the reason she became a CSI (in the strip club she formerly worked in), hiding in body bags—a plan devised by Russell. Catherine reveals she never planned to resign; it was a trap created by the assassins trying to kill her. In the end, Catherine takes a job with the FBI after her final case is closed. Russell strongly supports her in her decision. She holds a "family meeting" with all the team having a very emotional goodbye.

Following Willows' departure, Russell found himself heading up the team alone for the first time, and as such contacts Catherine regularly for moral support. Noting his need for a strong number two, a particularly bloody murder provides D.B. with the perfect opportunity to contact his former colleague and close friend Julie Finlay, who he had worked alongside in Seattle. Offering Finn a position on his team, Russell gains both a confidante and a skilled blood spatter analyst. This staffing decision was not without its setbacks, however. Some initial hesitation on the part of Finlay meant that Russell was forced to establish a number of ground rules to ensure a civil working relationship, much to the delight of his wife Barbara, with whom Julie had grown close.

Russell continues to work on cases-of-the-week with the CSI team for the rest of the twelfth season, until he comes into contact with Jeffrey McKeen, the former Under-Sheriff who was responsible for the death of Warrick Brown. It is thought that McKeen had been using his son to commit crimes from within prison. An investigation leads to Ecklie and Russell confronting, and Ecklie shooting dead, McKeen's son. Russell taunts McKeen about this death, and, as revenge, McKeen orders the kidnapping of Russell's granddaughter. The Las Vegas Crime Lab is placed under the supervision of an outside federal agency in order to ensure proper procedure is maintained following the McKeen investigation, whilst Ecklie is gunned down, and Finlay is kidnapped.

Season 13 

Season thirteen begins with Russell on the hunt for his granddaughter, after Jeffrey McKeen informs him that both Kaitlyn and Finlay are being held captive, for ransom. Whilst Russell interrogates McKeen, Finlay manages to free Kaitlyn, and is rescued by members of the LVPD, though Kaitlyn is once again taken in the commotion. As a result of the extreme pressure placed on him by the kidnapping, Russell not only imagines murdering McKeen, but also removes his firearm from a lock-box, with intent to use it. Kaitlyn is eventually located by the CSIs, though Russell and Finlay's friendship is put under extreme pressure in the process.

Also this season, Russell is forced to investigate the murder of his sons basketball coach in "Pick and Roll" and examine a mass-grave linked to his and Finlay's past in Seattle in "CSI on Fire," which leads to truths about Julie and his previous working relationship being revealed. In "In Vino Veritas" Russell is revealed to be friends with CSI Mac Taylor, and the two investigate the kidnapping of the latter's girlfriend in a case that forms part one of a two part crossover, and in "Backfire," he has to connect emotionally to a 6-year-old girl who is involved in a murder investigation. Russell faces his first foe in Las Vegas during the season thirteen finale, "Skin in the Game," during which murders following the pattern of Dante's inferno take place.

Throughout the course of this season, Russell's home life is put under strain due to the events following the McKeen investigation. Barbara and his daughter leave Las Vegas for a short time, with only the latter returning.

Season 14 

Season fourteen begins with D.B. heading the hunt for missing CSI Morgan Brody, once again demonstrating his strong and steadfast leadership style, though like season thirteen, the majority of Russell's time is spent on "cases of the week", whilst his home-life continues to suffer from the fallout of the McKeen investigation.

D.B. is taken hostage in the episode "The Fallen". When visiting P.D. a gun-man opens fire, killing officers, and locks himself in a room with the CSI. Russell develops a strong bond with the shooter during their time together, and is visibly shocked when the child is shot by armed officers. This episodes is the first time D.B. is openly exposed to cyber crime, a theme that will carry on throughout the season, and particularly in the episode "Kitty". During "Kitty" D.B. is introduced to FBI Special Agent Avery Ryan, an investigator based out of Washington. The two quickly become friends, and she introduces him to the darker side of the web, and builds upon the cyber-themes threaded throughout "The Fallen". D.B. is shown to have a keen interest in the different investigative techniques that can be used in this field.

Season 15 

In contrast to the previous seasons, season fifteen focuses heavily on Russell's past and his relationships within the team. The season begins with Finlay trapped in a car rigged to explode, whilst D.B. receives a phone-call from a man claiming to be the Gig Harbor Killer, a sadistic fugitive who Russell and Finlay believed they had killed in Seattle. Russell agrees to re-open this investigation in exchange for Finlay's life, saving Finn but risking his wider team's safety. The theme of danger is once again addressed during the episodes "Bad Blood" and "Girls Gone Wilder". During the former, Russell is shown to be deeply emotionally affected by Greg and Sara being exposed to a deadly pathogen, whilst in the latter a shooting at a conference provides Russell with the opportunity show case his forensic talents, helping to save the lives of Finn, Sara, and Morgan.  The Gig Harbor Killer returns several times throughout the season, and flashbacks reveal that following a struggle with Russell and the Gig Harbour Killer, the Unsub was shot by Finn in Seattle, however this was not the real killer. Suspicion falls upon one of Russell's Seattle CSIs when another is killed, though both Finn and D.B. are initially reluctant to believe Shaw is the killer.

It is revealed that the actual killer has been blackmailing Shaw, and the killers are in fact twin brothers Paul and Jared, as D.B. and Finn suspected. Shaw kills Jared, though Paul survives, and in a final showdown, attacks Finlay, leaving her unconscious in a car trunk. D.B. reveals that he has been visiting Finlay in hospital everyday, though doctors do not know if she will ever wake up from her coma.

At the end of the season, Russell convinces Nick Stokes to accept a supervisor position at the San Diego crime lab.

"Immortality" 
In "Immortality" Russell announces he is leaving Las Vegas in order to "head East" and pursue new challenges. He allows Sara to run his final case, opting to focus instead on the accompanying cyber forensics. He also meets Gil Grissom who returns at Ecklie's request to help with the bombing and Sara is later promoted into his now-vacant position, though she too leaves Las Vegas shortly thereafter, handing the position once again to Catherine Willows. Russell also reveals that Finlay has died following her altercation with the Gig Harbor Killer, though he states that, wherever he goes, she will go too. He takes with him a plaque dedicated to Finn's memory, reading "In memory of Julie Finlay. End of watch: February 15, 2015."

CSI: Cyber

Season 2 
Russell first appears in "Why-Fi" as the Director of Next Generation Cyber Forensics, working alongside Ryan and her team. Avery states that she has spent the last of the management budget building D.B.'s lab, ensuring nobody will be promoted to the position of Assistant Deputy Director. Russell immediately becomes interested in the workings of cyber crime, purchasing a drone, pacifiers, and electronic cockroaches, which he and Ryan test to their amusement ("Why-Fi"). It is later revealed that Russell's son has moved East, and he and his wife have divorced ("Heart Me"). He begins online dating in "Heart Me", securing his first date in "Red Crone". Also during "Red Crone", Russell's knowledge of forensic botany allows him to locate a tree consumed internally by a fungus, allowing him to locate two missing children. Nelson notes Russell's tendency to meditate, a skill which Russell later uses to help Avery with her inconsistent sleeping pattern. He also gives her herbal tea, which he claims has rare healing properties. In "hack E.R." Russell tells Ryan that, shortly before Finn was attacked he loaned her his favorite crime novel entitled "The Thin Man" which he read to her every day while she was comatose. She died before he finished reading it to her, though he later reads it to an unknown patient at the hospital they are investigating, saying "Goodbye, Jules" as he completes the final chapter. He tells Avery he is having trouble coping with the death of his best friend. In "Gone in 6 Seconds", Russell is revealed to be the only Cyber employee to still use pens, and he is notably disturbed when the springs from within them begin to disappear. He later joins Krumitz using homemade robots to destroy old technologies in the FBI basement. It is revealed in this episode that the team are aware of his full first name, something the Las Vegas CSIs did not know for a longer period. In "Python", Russell uncovers indicators of disease within a killer's DNA, which leads to Cyber uncovering the identity of a hacker, who later breaches the FBI's databases. Avery jokingly informs Russell that she hired him not for his investigative skills or good listening skills, but for his selection of tea leaves.

Throughout the second season, Russell builds a relationship with Greer Latimore, a former Special Agent whom he met in a bar. During the season finale, Russell is shot and wounded protecting Elijah, and upon recovery moves to Paris with Greer, tendering his resignation. The final scene depicts him mocking his own poor understanding of the French language at a Paris restaurant.

Positions 
 Russell was the Director of the Seattle Crime Lab, for an unknown period of time. He worked alongside his Assistant Supervisor Julie Finlay. 
 Russell was the Director of the Las Vegas Crime Lab, from 2011 to 2015 ("73 Seconds" to "Immortality"). His predecessor was Conrad Ecklie, who also served as Sheriff. He was succeeded by Sara Sidle, and later Catherine Willows. 
 Russell also served as Grave Shift Supervisor at the Las Vegas Crime Lab for the same period of time as he held the directorship. His predecessor was Catherine Willows, his successor was Sara Sidle, and later Willows. 
 Russell served as the Director of Next Generation Cyber Forensics for FBI Headquarters following his departure from the Las Vegas Crime Lab. He made his first appearance in "Why-Fi", in 2015. He resigned from FBI Cyber in March 2016.

Appearances 
 Danson starred as Russell in 86 episodes of CSI: Crime Scene Investigation, making his first appearance in "73 Seconds", and his final appearance in "Immortality". He appeared in every episode during his five seasons as a regular.
 Danson starred as Russell in 18 episodes of CSI: Cyber, making his first appearance in "Why-Fi", and his final appearance in "Legacy". He appeared in every episode but two during his season as a regular.

Episodic appearances
 CSI: NY "Seth and Apep".

References

External links
Character profile at Channel 5

CSI: Crime Scene Investigation characters
CSI: Cyber characters
Television characters introduced in 2011
Fictional botanists
Fictional forensic scientists
Fictional Seattle Police Department detectives
Fictional Las Vegas Police Department detectives
Crossover characters in television